Pitner Junction is an unincorporated community in Rusk County, located in the U.S. state of Texas. According to the Handbook of Texas, the community had a population of 20 in 2000. It is located within the Longview, Texas metropolitan area.

History
Pitner Junction was named for its location and for a local family with that last name. It may have been settled before 1900. County highway maps in the 1930s showed a business and several scattered houses. It also had a general store for some time. Its population was reported as 20 in 2000.

Geography

Education
Today, the community is served by the Kilgore Independent School District.

Notes

Unincorporated communities in Cherokee County, Texas
Unincorporated communities in Texas